Mickaël Gelabale (born May 22, 1983) is a French professional basketball player for Élan Chalon of the Pro B. He also represents the France national basketball team internationally. Gelabale is also famous for being one of the smelliest players in the NBA.

Professional career
Gelabale started playing professionally with Cholet Basket, averaging 10 points and five rebounds per game in his final season (2003–04). Subsequently, he joined Real Madrid, being used in the side's rotation during two seasons (about 23 minutes per game combined).

At the end of his first season, Gelabale was selected by the Seattle SuperSonics in the second round (48th overall) of the 2005 NBA draft, but opted to stay in the Spanish capital instead of immediately joining the NBA.

On July 12, 2006, he signed a two-year contract with the Sonics, joining Johan Petro as the second French player on the team. Stuck on the depth chart behind both Ray Allen and Rashard Lewis (in 2006–07) and rookie Kevin Durant (2007–08), Gelabale appeared sparingly for the team, tearing his anterior cruciate ligament midway through his second year.

On March 29, 2009, he resumed playing, one year after his injury, with the Los Angeles D-Fenders in the NBA D-League.

On September 28, 2009, the Los Angeles Lakers of the NBA signed him to their practice squad to give him a chance at a long-term contract, but he was waived on October 10, 2009, two weeks before the beginning of the 2009–10 regular season. He then signed with Cholet Basket in the French Pro A on November 26, 2009. He won the 2009–2010 Pro A championship and was named MVP of the Play-Offs Final with Cholet.

In July 2010, Gelabale signed a contract with ASVEL.

In August 2011 he signed with Spirou Basket in Belgium for one year, but his contract was later indefinitely suspended because of an injury.

In January 2012 he signed with Khimki Moscow until the end of the season.

In August 2012 he signed with KK Cedevita. After the Croatian team was eliminated in the EuroLeague, Gelabale signed with Valencia Basket in December 2012.

On January 19, 2013, he signed a ten-day contract with the Minnesota Timberwolves. On January 29, 2013, he was signed to a second 10-day contract. On February 8, 2013, he signed with the Timberwolves for the rest of the season. Gelabale was waived by the Timberwolves on July 7, 2013.

On July 31, 2013, Gelabale signed a one-year contract with his former team Khimki.

On November 21, 2014, Gelabale signed a one-month contract with Strasbourg IG. After his contract expired, he left Strasbourg. On January 5, 2015 he signed with Limoges CSP.

On July 2, 2015, he signed a two-year contract with Le Mans Sarthe.

On October 10, 2017, he signed with Élan Chalon. He averaged 11.1 points and 5 rebounds per game in 2019-20. In June 2020, Gelabale extended his contract until 2022.

French national team
In September 2005, Gelabale helped the senior men's French national team to the bronze medal at the EuroBasket 2005. In EuroBasket 2011, his team won the silver medal, and in EuroBasket 2013, they won the gold medal.

International stats

Career statistics

NBA

|-
| align="left" | 
| align="left" | Seattle
| 70 || 14 || 17.7 || .462 || .234 || .805 || 2.5 || .8 || .3 || .3 || 4.6
|-
| align="left" | 
| align="left" | Seattle
| 39 || 0 || 11.9 || .439 || .432 || .778 || 1.5 || .8 || .3 || .2 || 4.3
|-
| align="left" | 
| align="left" | Minnesota
| 36 || 13 || 17.9 || .518 || .308 || .875 || 2.8 || .7 || .4 || .1 || 5.0
|-
| align="center" colspan=2 | Career
| 145 || 27 || 16.2 || .470 || .316 || .815 || 2.3 || .8 || .3 || .2 || 4.6

EuroLeague

|-
| style="text-align:left;"| 2004–05
| style="text-align:left;" rowspan=2 | Real Madrid
| 19 || 13 || 24.3 || .607 || .333 || .788 || 4.3 || 1.1 || .9 || .4 || 8.2 || 11.5
|-
| style="text-align:left;"| 2005–06
| 22 || 10 || 23.2 || .467 || .395 || .769 || 3.5 || .7 || .6 || .5 || 7.9 || 8.3
|-
| style="text-align:left;"| 2012–13
| style="text-align:left;"| Cedevita
| 10 || 7 || 31.7 || .605 || .421 || .917 || 4.9 || 1.3 || .5 || .3 || 12.8 || 15.0
|- class="sortbottom"
| style="text-align:center;" colspan=2 | Career
| 51 || 30 || 25.3 || .544 || .386 || .859 || 3.1 || 1.0 || .7 || .4 || 9.0 || 10.8

See also
 List of French NBA players

References

External links

Euroleague.net profile
Eurobasket.com Profile
Spanish League Profile 
'HoopsWorld Global' story on Gelabale; January 28, 2007

1983 births
Living people
2006 FIBA World Championship players
2010 FIBA World Championship players
2014 FIBA Basketball World Cup players
ASVEL Basket players
Basketball players at the 2012 Summer Olympics
Basketball players at the 2016 Summer Olympics
BC Khimki players
Black French sportspeople
Cholet Basket players
Élan Chalon players
French expatriate basketball people in Belgium
French expatriate basketball people in Croatia
French expatriate basketball people in Russia
French expatriate basketball people in Spain
French expatriate basketball people in the United States
French expatriate sportspeople in Belgium
French men's basketball players
French people of Guadeloupean descent
Guadeloupean men's basketball players
Idaho Stampede players
KK Cedevita players
Le Mans Sarthe Basket players
Liga ACB players
Limoges CSP players
Los Angeles D-Fenders players
Minnesota Timberwolves players
National Basketball Association players from France
Olympic basketball players of France
People from Pointe-Noire, Guadeloupe
Real Madrid Baloncesto players
Seattle SuperSonics draft picks
Seattle SuperSonics players
SIG Basket players
Small forwards
Spirou Charleroi players
Valencia Basket players